Andrew Mangiapane (born April 4, 1996) is a Canadian professional ice hockey left winger currently playing for the Calgary Flames of the National Hockey League (NHL). He previously played with the Barrie Colts of Ontario Hockey League (OHL). He was selected by the Flames in the sixth round, 166th overall, of the 2015 NHL Entry Draft.

Playing career

Junior
Mangiapane went undrafted in the OHL Priority Draft after the 2012–13 Greater Toronto Hockey League season with Toronto Jr. Canadiens U-18 AAA where he scored 14 goals and 22 assists in 32 games and subsequently signed with the Barrie Colts as a free agent. In his first year with the Ontario Hockey League (OHL)'s Barrie Colts, Mangiapane's outstanding play was rewarded when he was named to the 2013–14 OHL First All-Rookie Team. Despite Mangiapane's success,  he would go unranked by NHL Central Scouting Bureau and go undrafted in the 2014 NHL Entry Draft. During the 2014–15 season, Mangiapane reached 100 points, scoring 43 goals and 104 points in 68 games played. The following season, he was named an alternate captain for the Colts.

Calgary Flames

On March 23, 2016, Mangiapane was signed to an entry-level contract by the Calgary Flames, the organization which drafted him in the sixth round, 166th overall, in the 2015 NHL Entry Draft. Prior to the 2015 NHL Entry Draft, Mangiapane was listed as the 85th ranked North American skater by the NHL Central Scouting Bureau. Scouts described Mangiapane as an undersized, two-way forward with strong skating, speed, agility and puck protection.

After attending the Flames' training camp ahead of the 2017–18 season, Mangipane was reassigned to the club's American Hockey League (AHL) affiliate, the Stockton Heat, to begin the 2017–18 season. Recalled by the Flames, he made his NHL debut on December 31, 2017, in a game against the Chicago Blackhawks. He was reassigned to the Heat on January 15, 2018, after playing seven games with Calgary.

Mangiapane began the 2018–19 season in the AHL for Stockton. On November 30, 2018, he was called up by Calgary after recording 14 points in 13 games with the Heat. Although he was reassigned to the AHL on December 16, he was recalled a few days later after the Flames' Michael Frolík was placed on injured reserve. On January 13, 2019, Mangiapane earned his first NHL point in a 7–1 win over the Arizona Coyotes, assisting on captain Mark Giordano's first-period goal. Mangiapane re-signed with the Calgary Flames with a two-year $4.850 million contract on October 16, 2020, just four days before a scheduled arbitration hearing.

Mangiapane was voted as the most valuable player by the media in the 2021 Men's Ice Hockey World Championships in Latvia.  During the tournament, he scored 7 goals and 4 assists in 7 games to help propel Canada to its first World Championship title since 2016. Before Mangiapane arrived, Team Canada had lost all three of its round-robin games, but went 6-0-1 after Mangiapane joined the team.

Personal 
Mangiapane is of Italian descent from his father, and Scottish from his mother. He attended St. Michaels catholic high school in Bolton

Career statistics

Regular season and playoffs

International

Awards and honours

References

External links 

1996 births
Living people
Barrie Colts players
Calgary Flames draft picks
Calgary Flames players
Canadian expatriate ice hockey players in the United States
Canadian ice hockey left wingers
Canadian people of Italian descent
Canadian people of Scottish descent
Stockton Heat players
People from Caledon, Ontario